The Miss Nicaragua 2010 pageant, was held on February 27, 2010 in Managua, after weeks of events.  At the conclusion of the final night of competition, Scharllette Allen Moses became the first Miss Nicaragua titleholder from the Caribbean Coast of Nicaragua. She represented Nicaragua at Miss Universe 2010 held later that year in Las Vegas, USA.  The rest of the finalists would enter different pageants.

Placements

Special Awards

 Best Regional Costume - Managua - Maryoli Cabezas
 Most Beautiful Face - Bluefields - Scharllette Allen
 Miss Photogenic - Estelí - Meyling Merlo
 Miss Congeniality - San Juan de Limay - Jeyzzell Rivera
 Miss Nicaraguan Proud - Carazo - Myriam Alejandra Cerda
 Best Hair - Rivas - Indira Rojas

Official Contestants

Judges

 Otto de la Rocha - Nicaraguan Composer & Singer
 Marinelly Rivas Blanco - President of National Tourism Institute
 Antonio Pérez-Hernández y Torra - Spanish Ambassador in Nicaragua
 Rossana Lacayo - Nicaraguan Photographer and Cinematographer
 Tatiana Cordero -  Owner of G&B BOUTIQUE
 Daniel Garzon -  Nicaraguan Goldsmith
 Thelma Rodriguez - Miss Nicaragua 2008

.

Background Music

Opening Show – Trio Xolotlan  - "Managua"
Swimsuit Competition - Ke$ha - "TiK ToK"
Evening Gown Competition – Bond - "Scorchio"

.

Special Guests

 Ballet Macehuatl  - "Managua, Nicaragua"
 Otto de la Rocha - "Managua, Linda Managua"
 Los Juglares - "Barrio De Pescadores"

.

References

Miss Nicaragua
2010 in Nicaragua
2010 beauty pageants